Wallimann is a surname. Notable people with the surname include:

 David Wallimann, musician in the American progressive rock group Glass Hammer
 Theo Wallimann (born 1946), Swiss cell biologist
 Mariangela Wallimann-Bornatico (born 1948), former Secretary-General of the Swiss Federal Assembly